The StFX Student Union, known as The U, represents the students at St. Francis Xavier University in Antigonish, Nova Scotia, Canada. It is a student-run organization; it represents over 4000 students and it provides many services and activities. The U sits as a voting member on the federal lobbying group CASA and studentsNS (formerly ANSSA).

Structure

The U is organized as a collegial student government. Each January a president and vice president run separately from each other, and are elected by the student body. The elected officials then choose an executive team which serves as their cabinet for the following year. The new executive team works to structure the following year's budget and determine the organization's direction.

The hired executive is then ratified by the Students' Representative Council (who are the elected officials of The U).

The executive and chair of council work at the university during the summer to plan for the following year. In September, when the students return, council becomes active and the executives and council meet to discuss the general operations of the union and report/vote/pass various issues affecting student life at X.

2021–2022 Executive:

2021-22 Council: 

2019–2020 Executive:

2019–2020 Council:

Bloomfield Centre
The StFX Students' Union is located in the Bloomfield Centre in Antigonish Nova Scotia. The offices of the president, executives and councillors are located on the fourth floor. Council Chambers can also be found on the same floor; this is home to Council and Senate meetings.

History

The StFX Student Union was incorporated in 1965  by James Sutton, Paul Rusyniak, Thomas McGowan, Joseph Coffey and Robert Hutton. Since its incorporation, the union has been a major part of the university.

The Students' Union initially began to represent the student body as a whole while providing activities and social events on campus as well as societies. The union has since expanded through adding services such as tutoring, student advocates, drive-home service, campus police, and a darkroom for photo developing. It has also created off campus support services such as a student food bank, housing list, as well as staff to help with tenancy concerns.

The union was also integrated within the University administration over the years, sitting on all major committees to represent student concerns at all levels within the University.

The well known "X-Ring" ceremony, which takes place each year on 3 December, is also organized by the Students' Union.

In 2004 the union successfully lobbied the University for lighting to be installed on campus to prevent crime and sexual assault. They also succeeded in increasing library hours.

In February 2006, Adam Hinton and Lila Pavey were elected as Students' Union president and vice president. During the 2006–2007 academic year, the union brought in communications initiatives to improve signage, branding, and technologies among other things. As part of this process the StFX Students' Union was rebranded as The U.

In July 2006, the Student Union launched its new website which included the new logo.

In early 2007, the Student Union implemented a long term strategic plan which focused on communication, accountability, environmental sustainability, post-secondary research, financial growth, and enhanced internal leadership training. A new constitution, which declared the Student Union's stance on students rights issues, was also passed.

In January 2007 the Student Union organized a protest against plans to change the residences of Burke, Fraser, and Plessis into a single residence. The protest was based on the strong house spirit of each of the residences.

In March 2007, Adam Harris and Marc Rodrigue were elected as Students' Union president and vice president for the 2007–2008 academic year.

In February 2008, Matt MacGillivray and Julia Clarke were elected as the Students' Union president elect and vice-president elect for the 2008–2009 academic year.

In February 2009, Sandy MacIntosh and Sheryl MacAulay were elected as Students' Union president elect and vice-president elect for the 2009–2010 academic year.

In February 2010, Sam Mason and Alia Hack were elected as Students' Union president elect and vice-president elect for the 2010–2011 academic year.

In January 2011 the Student Union organized a protest after the administration made the decision to abolish the student-run campus police force without consulting the students, and then revoked the student union's ability to send out email messages to the student body. Instead, vice president recruitment and student experience, Keith Publicover, must now approve all mass email communication. Another issue is the possibility that the school's all-female and all-male residence houses, Cameron Hall and MacKinnon Hall, could become co-ed on May 1; the Residence Office has refused to reassign students to those houses or communicate about what the plans are for the two buildings. The plans never went through, and the residences remain single-gendered. Keith Publicover also resigned from his position during the summer of 2012.

In January 2012, Nick Head-Peterson and Rachel Mitchell were elected as Students' Union president and vice president for the 2012–2013 year.

In January 2013, Ben Gunn-Doerge and Taylor Mason were elected as Students' Union president and vice president for the 2013–2014 year. In January 2014, council made a motion to pass a new executive structure, which will now consist of: the president (elected), vice president (elected), VP internal, VP finance and operations, VP communications, VP activities and events, and VP external.

In January 2014, Brandon Hamilton and Alicia Silliker were elected as Students' Union president and vice president for the 2014–2015 year.

In February 2015, returning executive member Troy Mrazek was elected as president and Hannah Stordy was elected as the vice president for the 2015–2016 year. This was the first year for the elimination of president and vice president slates.

During 2017–2018, the Students' Union, with Annie Sirois serving as president and Patrick Panet-Raymond serving as vice president, announced their full support of the administration's move to change Cameron Hall and MacKinnon Hall to co-ed residences. This decision was met with very vocal opposition leading to a large attendance in the gallery of student council on February 11.  Soon after a petition for impeachment of the president and vice-president was circulated. The next council meeting reported their own survey results stating "The majority of students in this survey did not support these changes so to change our wording to support would be a direct contradiction to what was mandated by the students." In a later council meeting, upon hearing that the student petition to impeach had surpassed 900 signatories, moved to acknowledge an ambiguity in the bylaws effectively making them unimpeachable. The committee tasked with resolving the ambiguity did not complete their mandate.

In 2018, Rebecca Messay was elected as president with an outstanding victory. Tiffany MacLennan was also successful in her campaign for vice president. During this year, the Students' Union successfully lobbied the university for the addition of a fall reading week (project led by MacLennan).

In 2019, The election for vice president academic ended with Emma Kuzmyk winning by a landslide. After a controversial campaign period, Cecil VanBuskirk was elected president for the 2019–2020 year. On March 6, Emma Kuzmyk was unofficially elected vice president.

On March 14, 2019, council struck an ad hoc committee, named the Governance Review Committee, to redraft the union's governing documents (including the act of incorporation) and remove ambiguities.

References

External links

St. Francis Xavier University

Students' associations in Canada
Antigonish, Nova Scotia